Escape from Hong Kong  is a 1942 American comedy film.  Valerie Hale (Marjorie Lord) is a double agent working for the British, with information on a secret plan for the Allies to help Chiang Kai-shek repel the Axis powers from Hong Kong.  She is believed to be the last person to see Col. J. A. Crosley alive and is suspected of his murder.  She inadvertently crosses paths with three vaudeville performers Pancho (Leo Carrillo), Blimp (Andy Devine) and Rusty (Don Terry) who falls in love with her. Hale blows her cover by revealing her assignment to the man she believes is Major Colin Reeves (Leyland Hodgson), but is in reality the German spy Von Metz. Pancho, Blimp and Rusty run interference for her and capture the real spies.

Cast
Leo Carrillo – Pancho
Andy Devine – Blimp
Marjorie Lord – Valerie Hale, Fraulein K
Don Terry – Rusty
Gilbert Emery – Col. J. A. Crosley
Leyland Hodgson – Major Colin Reeves aka Von Metz

References

External links
 
 
 
 

1942 films
1942 horror films
1940s comedy horror films
American black-and-white films
American comedy horror films
World War II films made in wartime
Films set in Hong Kong
1942 comedy films
Films directed by William Nigh
Universal Pictures films
1940s English-language films